Ramsau may refer to:

Ramsau, Lower Austria
Ramsau am Dachstein, Austria
Ramsau im Zillertal, Austria
Ramsau bei Berchtesgaden, Germany